Christopher John Laycock (1887 – 3 December 1960) was a British lawyer, the founder of one of Singapore's earliest law firms, Laycock and Ong. He was also one of the founders of the Singapore Progressive Party.

Early life
Laycock grew up in Manchester, England, and was an influential figure in the early development of rock climbing on the gritstone edges of the Peak District of Derbyshire along with his close friends Siegfried Herford, also of Manchester, and Stanley Jeffcoat of Buxton. In 1903 Laycock became a founder member of the Manchester-based Rucksack Club which included many other local climbing enthusiasts, including Charles Pilkington of the glass manufacturing dynasty. Laycock, Herford and Jeffcoat climbed numerous new routes on many of the fine escarpments of Derbyshire, Staffordshire and Yorkshire in the years leading up to the First World War, and these were faithfully recorded in Laycock's guidebook Some Gritstone Climbs, the first published guidebook on rock climbing in the Peak District.

The Rucksack Club opposed the publication of the book as a number of the crags described were on private property and the club was concerned about trespass law. Laycock resigned from the club in disgust and the book was published by the Refuge Printing Department (an insurance company in Manchester at the time) in 1913.  In the years that followed both Herford and Jeffcoat were killed in the trenches of Flanders, and Laycock never fully recovered from their loss.  He left England for Singapore and, it is said, never went rock climbing again, although he wrote a preface to Fergus Graham's guidebook Recent Developments on Gritstone published in 1926.

The Island Club of Singapore
Laycock founded the Race Course Golf Club, Singapore's first truly multi-racial club, on 1 October 1924 at Farrer Park. The club served Asians who wanted to learn to play golf but could not join the exclusively European Royal Singapore Golf Club, and other avid golfers living around the Bukit Timah area. The Club lasted for three years, before it was evicted by the Turf Club land-owners who had sold the land.

Thus Laycock began searching for a new location for the golf club, and in 1929 found the perfect location in the MacRitchie catchment area. Laycock, then a Municipal Commissioner of Singapore, and his friends A.P. Rajah and Tan Chye Cheng, immediately submitted their plans for the new club for the locations, and received their stamp of approval at the General Committee Meeting of the Singapore Municipal Council on 28 June 1929. Design for the 18-hole course was done by Peter Robinson of Braid Hills, Edinburgh and the construction began in March 1930. Laycock and his grounds committee, with members such as Dr Harold Lim, supervised the entire project for the next two years. The new club was officially opened and renamed The Island Club on 27 August 1932, officiated by Sir Cecil Clementi, Governor of Singapore. Sir Chan Sze Jin CMG (S.J. Chan) became the club's first President, and Laycock took on the role as First Captain.

Death 
Laycock died in Singapore on 3 December 1960 and was buried in Bidadari Cemetery.

References

20th-century Singaporean lawyers
British Malaya lawyers
Progressive Party (Singapore) politicians
Members of the Legislative Council of Singapore
1887 births
1960 deaths
Lawyers from Manchester
British rock climbers
20th-century English lawyers
British people in British Malaya